Cicatrodea is a genus of longhorn beetles of the subfamily Lamiinae, containing the following species:

 Cicatrodea bahia Dillon & Dillon, 1946
 Cicatrodea monima Dillon & Dillon, 1946

References

Onciderini